"Lying Is the Most Fun a Girl Can Have Without Taking Her Clothes Off", often shortened to "Lying Is the Most Fun...", is a single by American rock band Panic! at the Disco from their debut studio album, A Fever You Can't Sweat Out (2005). The song's title was taken from a line of dialog in the 2004 film Closer (based on a 1997 play of the same name). The line, spoken by Natalie Portman's character, Alice, is, "Lying is the most fun a girl can have without taking her clothes off, but it's better if you do." "But It's Better If You Do", another song by Panic! at the Disco, was released as a single prior to "Lying is the Most Fun...".

Released on August 7, 2006, "Lying" was the third commercially released single from the album and fourth overall ("The Only Difference Between Martyrdom and Suicide Is Press Coverage" was only released promotionally). In the United States, the song impacted radio on October 17, 2006, and peaked at number 28 on the Billboard Alternative Songs chart, number 96 on the Pop 100, and number four on the Bubbling Under Hot 100 Singles chart. Internationally, the song reached number 39 on the UK Singles Chart, number 26 on the Australian Singles Chart, and number 33 in New Zealand Singles Chart.

Music video
The music video was directed by Travis Kopach and filmed on June 19, 2006 in Los Angeles, California. The video was premiered on MTV2 on July 14, 2006. It features people with fish tanks on their heads. The video only shows the band in one scene (the paramedics are the band members), because the band felt that their looks were distracting from their music.

Panic! at the Disco has stated that the music video is simply a 1950s period short film and the man (Daniel Gomez) and woman (Molly D'Amour) are a couple, but not necessarily married. The music video includes a 15-second intro instead of starting the vocals right at the beginning. The band explained on Steven's Untitled Rock Show that they chose Kopach for the video because they felt his treatment was the most unconventional of the ones they had been offered.

Track listings
UK CD and digital download
 "Lying Is the Most Fun a Girl Can Have Without Taking Her Clothes Off"
 "I Write Sins Not Tragedies" (live from Astoria)

UK CD single
 "Lying Is the Most Fun a Girl Can Have Without Taking Her Clothes Off"
 "Build God, Then We'll Talk" (Live from Astoria)
 "Lying Is the Most Fun a Girl Can Have Without Taking Her Clothes Off" (video)
 "Lying Is the Most Fun a Girl Can Have Without Taking Her Clothes Off" (live video from Astoria)

UK 7-inch picture disc
 "Lying Is the Most Fun a Girl Can Have Without Taking Her Clothes Off"
 "The Only Difference Between Martyrdom and Suicide Is Press Coverage" (live from Astoria)

WMI CD and digital download
 "Lying Is the Most Fun a Girl Can Have Without Taking Her Clothes Off" (radio edit)
 "Lying Is the Most Fun a Girl Can Have Without Taking Her Clothes Off" (album version)
 "I Write Sins Not Tragedies" (live from Astoria)
 "Build God, Then We'll Talk" (live from Astoria)

Charts

Certifications

Release history

References

Panic! at the Disco songs
2005 songs
2006 singles
Fueled by Ramen singles
Songs about infidelity
Songs written by Brendon Urie
Songs written by Ryan Ross
Songs written by Spencer Smith (musician)